La Société Expéditionnaire is a Pennsylvania-based independent record label established in 2006 by Lewis & Clarke's Lou Rogai. On previous Lewis & Clarke albums, the liner notes contained a contact address for "The Expeditionary Society", a nod to the exploratory reference of Lewis & Clarke. This phrase was also taped to the door of Rogai's studio in Delaware Water Gap, Pennsylvania. An intoxicated French Appalachian Trail through-hiker mistakenly stumbled into the practice room, thinking it was the local hostel, and exclaimed "La Société Expéditionnaire!".

The first official release was a split 7-inch record by Strand of Oaks and Dragon Turtle. It marked the first of many working collaborations between Rogai and Dragon Turtle's Tom Asselin (audio engineer) and Brian Lightbody (graphic designer).

Mission 

La Société Expéditionnaire is an independent record label which provides a framework of production, promotion and distribution for musicians and artists. The goal is to uncover and expose the "hidden gems" of wild, fragile and obscure music.

Roster
 Arc in Round
 Matt Bauer
 Martin Bisi
 The Black Swans
 Blessed Feathers
 Jonathan Byerley
 Judson Claiborne
 Columboid
 Dragon Turtle
 Fantastic
 Daniel Knox
 Laser Background
 Lewis & Clarke
 Moon & Moon
 Mako Sica
 Soars
 Soltero
 Strand of Oaks
 Joey Sweeney
 Tamarin

References

American independent record labels